William H. Dugan  (1864–1921) was an American professional baseball catcher. He played during the 1884 season for the Richmond Virginians of the American Association and the Kansas City Cowboys of the Union Association. His brother, Ed Dugan, was his teammate on the Virginians. He played with four different minor league teams in 1885 and finished his career in the New England League in 1887.

External links

1864 births
1921 deaths
Major League Baseball catchers
Baseball players from New York (state)
Richmond Virginians players
Kansas City Cowboys (UA) players
19th-century baseball players
Richmond Virginians (minor league) players
Jersey City Skeeters players
Newark Domestics players
Kansas City Cowboys (minor league) players
Omaha Omahogs players
Keokuk Hawkeyes players